Skyfari is the name of aerial tramway/gondola lifts at multiple zoos in the United States:

 Bronx Zoo
 Henry Doorly Zoo and Aquarium
 San Diego Zoo
 Southwick's Zoo